Western Scheldt Tunnel is a  tunnel in the Netherlands that carries highway N62 under the Western Scheldt estuary between Ellewoutsdijk and Terneuzen. It is the longest tunnel for highway traffic in the Netherlands.

History and description
The tunnel was built by a consortium of Franki Construct, Heijmans, Royal BAM Group, Philipp Holzmann, TBI Beton- en Waterbouw Voormolen and Wayss & Freytag on behalf of NV Westerscheldetunnel (Western Scheldt Tunnel Company), which is 100% owned by the province of Zeeland. The tunnel was opened on 14 March 2003. Since then, the two automobile ferry lines Flushing-Breskens and Kruiningen-Perkpolder, operated by the Provincial Steamboat Service (Provinciale Stoombootdiensten), have been discontinued.

The Western Scheldt Tunnel is a bored tunnel and consists of two tubes which were excavated by a tunnel boring machine. Each tube has two car lanes without a hard shoulder. Every 250 metres, the two tunnel tubes are connected by lateral connections. Normally the cross-connections are closed and locked. In an emergency, the doors unlock automatically. The traffic in the left driving lane of the other tunnel is stopped, allowing people to walk safely into the other tunnel.

For both directions, the toll is collected near Borssele, near the north end of the tunnel.

Bus services
The tunnel is not accessible for pedestrians, cyclists or moped riders; however, there are bus services and on request (one hour in advance) bicycles and mopeds can be transported in the bus and a trailer, respectively. Public transport nodes are Tolplein (Borsele) on the north bank and Terneuzen Busstation on the south bank. Bus services through these nodes are provided by Connexxion:

Bus 20: Goes-Tolplein-Terneuzen bus station-Sluiskil-Sas van Gent-Zelzate (Flanders)
Bus 50: between Middelburg and Hulst

Regular bus fares apply.

Tolls

 Cars: €5.00
 Motorcycles €2.50
 Cars with caravan: €7.45
 Small trucks, campers and buses: €18.20
 Large trucks: €25.00

Emergency vehicles and military vehicles are toll-free.

Reduced tolls are available for subscribers (respectively €3.05, €4.55, €11.15 and €15.25). That is more expensive than the ferry over the Western Scheldt that operated before the tunnel was opened. As well, there is no reduced toll for residents of Zeelandic Flanders (Zeeuws-Vlaanderen).

Correct as of 12/04/2014

Lawsuit Committee Tunnel Toll Free

In April 2006, Zeelandic Flanders citizens in cooperation with the Socialist Party of Terneuzen established the Lawsuit Committee Tunnel Toll-Free (Actiecomité TunnelTolvrij.nl). The purpose of this lawsuit is first to oppose the sale of the tunnel and secondly to make the tunnel toll free.

References

External links

Toll tunnels in Europe
Road tunnels in the Netherlands
Tunnels in Zeeland
Tunnels completed in 2003
Borsele
Terneuzen
Zeelandic Flanders
Zuid-Beveland